Kurtunwarey District is a district of the southeastern Lower Shabelle (Shabeellaha Hoose) region in Somalia.

References

External links
 Districts of Somalia
 Administrative map of Kurtunwarey District

Districts of Somalia

Lower Shabelle